The Howard Longley House is a historic house in South Pasadena, California, U.S. In 1897, Greene and Greene recorded job no. 23 as a residence for Howard and Etta Longley at 1005 Buena Vista Street, with a valuation of $3,876. Mr. Longley was "the brother-in-law of Dr. Greene's [i.e., Charles and Henry Greene's father] sister, Alice." The house is significant as one of the earliest surviving residences designed by Greene & Greene. On 6 August 1897, the Los Angeles Journal reported that plans for the house were being prepared. The Longley house stands next to the Lucretia Garfield House (designed by Greene & Greene in 1904 for the widow of President James Garfield). The Longley House was listed on the National Register of Historic Places on April 16, 1974.

References

Houses on the National Register of Historic Places in California
Houses completed in 1897
Houses in Los Angeles County, California